Madiha Iftikhar (Urdu: مدیحہ افتخار)  (born on 5 February 1985 is a Pakistani TV drama actress and model.

Early life
Madiha Iftikhar was born to Iftikhar Ahmed and Rehana Iftikhar, in Islamabad, Pakistan. Her parents used to do a show 'Boltey Haath' (speaking hands) which was based on sign language for deaf and mute special people. The show was aired on weekends on PTV in the 1990s.

Career
Madiha Iftikhar began her acting career, at the age of 17 years, in Partition Aik Safar, one of the most expensive TV dramas ever produced in Pakistan.

She is currently the Brand Ambassador for Olivia Whitening Creme and has appeared in its advertisement campaigns since February 2011.

Television
She also has appeared in the following TV drama serials:
Aashti (2009 Hum TV Drama)
Souteli
Kaise Yeh Junoon
Dil Dard Dhuan
Sarkar Sahab
Andata
Tujhe Pe Qurban
Ishq Ki Inteha (2009-2010)
Mann Se Poocho
Zagham
Kitni Girhain Baaki Hain
Meri Behan Meri Dewrani (ARY Digital TV)
Mujhe Apna Bana Lo
Jaan Hatheli Par

Personal life
Iftikhar resides in Karachi and is married.

TV morning show host
Madiha Iftikhar hosted Raunaq-e-Ramadan transmission of 2013 on Dawn News TV channel.

References

External links
Madiha Iftikhar on IMDb website

1985 births
Living people
Pakistani female models
People from Islamabad
Pakistani television actresses
Actresses from Karachi
21st-century Pakistani actresses